Debi Soren  is an Indian politician. He was a Member of Parliament, representing Dumka in the Lok Sabha the lower house of India's Parliament as a member of the Jharkhand Party.

References

External links
 Official biographical sketch in Parliament of India website

Lok Sabha members from Bihar
Jharkhand Party politicians
India MPs 1957–1962
1904 births
Year of death missing